Constance Elizabeth Chapman (1919-2005) was a British children's author who created a series of books based on a fictional red lorry called "Marmaduke". The series began in the 1950s. The Marmaduke books were also published in Dutch (where Marmaduke became "Marmaduk") and in Swedish (where Marmaduke became "Lastbilen Teo.") (According to OCLC WorldCat Identities, she is the author of "37 works in 65 publications in 3 languages and 423 library holdings.")

Titles
 Riding With Marmaduke. (1955) could be an alternate title
 Marmaduke the Lorry [1]
 Marmaduke and Joe  [2]
 Adventures with Marmaduke [3]
 Merry Marmaduke [4]
 Marmaduke and His Friends [5]
 Marmaduke and the Elephant [6] (1959)
 Marmaduke And The Lambs [7]
 Marmaduke Goes to France [8]
 Marmaduke Goes to Holland [9]
 Marmaduke Goes to America [10]
 Marmaduke Goes to Wales
 Marmaduke Goes to Spain
 Marmaduke Goes to Italy
 Marmaduke Goes to Ireland
 Marmaduke Goes to Morocco
 Marmaduke Goes to Scotland
 Marmaduke Goes to Switzerland 

The audio of the books was originally recorded by Kenneth Williams. They were published by Brockhampton Press.

Sources 
 Marmaduke and the elephant amazon.co.uk 88pp.
 Riding With Marmaduke AmwellBookCompany.co.uk
 Marmaduke Goes to Morocco Hodder And Stoughton, 1979 AntiQbook (with photo)

References

 

1919 births
2005 deaths
British women children's writers
English children's writers
20th-century English women writers
People from Barnsley